This is a list of 270 species in Uranotaenia, a genus of mosquitoes in the family Culicidae.

Uranotaenia species

 Uranotaenia abdita Peyton, 1977 c g
 Uranotaenia abstrusa Peyton, 1977 c g
 Uranotaenia aequatorianna Levi-Castillo, 1953 c g
 Uranotaenia alba Theobald, 1901 c g
 Uranotaenia albescens Taylor, 1914 c g
 Uranotaenia albimanus da Cunha Ramos & Brunhes, 2004 c g
 Uranotaenia albinotata da Cunha Ramos & Brunhes, 2004 c g
 Uranotaenia albipes Peyton, 1977 c g
 Uranotaenia alboabdominalis Theobald, 1910 c g
 Uranotaenia alboannulata (Theobald, 1905) c
 Uranotaenia albocephala da Cunha Ramos & Brunhes, 2004 c g
 Uranotaenia albosternopleura Peters, 1963 c g
 Uranotaenia alticola Peters, 1963 c g
 Uranotaenia ambodimanga da Cunha Ramos & Brunhes, 2004 c g
 Uranotaenia amiensis Peters, 1963 c g
 Uranotaenia andavakae Doucet, 1950 c g
 Uranotaenia andreae Doucet, 1961 c g
 Uranotaenia angolensis Cunha Ramos, 1985 c g
 Uranotaenia anhydor Dyar and Shannon i c g
 Uranotaenia annandalei Barraud, 1926 c g
 Uranotaenia annulata Theobald, 1901 c g
 Uranotaenia anopheloides Brunhes & Razafindrasolo, 1975 c g
 Uranotaenia antalahaensis da Cunha Ramos & Brunhes, 2004 c g
 Uranotaenia antennalis Taylor, 1919 c g
 Uranotaenia apicalis Theobald, 1903 c g
 Uranotaenia apicosquamata da Cunha Ramos & Brunhes, 2004 c g
 Uranotaenia apicotaeniata Theobald, 1909 c g
 Uranotaenia approximata Peyton, 1977 c g
 Uranotaenia argentipleura da Cunha Ramos & Brunhes, 2004 c g
 Uranotaenia arguellesi Baisas, 1935 c g
 Uranotaenia argyrotarsis Leicester, 1908 c g
 Uranotaenia ascidiicola Meijere, 1910 c g
 Uranotaenia atra Theobald, 1905 c g
 Uranotaenia balfouri Theobald, 1904 c g
 Uranotaenia bambusicola da Cunha Ramos & Brunhes, 2004 c g
 Uranotaenia barnesi Belkin, 1953 c g
 Uranotaenia belkini Grjebine, 1979 c g
 Uranotaenia benoiti Wolfs, 1964 c g
 Uranotaenia bertii Cova Garcia & Rausseo, 1964 c g
 Uranotaenia bicincta da Cunha Ramos & Brunhes, 2004 c g
 Uranotaenia bicolor Leicester, 1908 c g
 Uranotaenia bidentata da Cunha Ramos & Brunhes, 2004 c g
 Uranotaenia bifasciata da Cunha Ramos & Brunhes, 2004 c g
 Uranotaenia bilineata Theobald, 1909 c g
 Uranotaenia bimaculata Leicester, 1908 c g
 Uranotaenia bimaculiala Leicester, 1908 c g
 Uranotaenia bosseri Grjebine, 1979 c g
 Uranotaenia boussesi da Cunha Ramos & Brunhes, 2004 c g
 Uranotaenia breviseta da Cunha Ramos & Brunhes, 2004 c g
 Uranotaenia bricenoi Cova Garcia, Pulido & Escalante de Ugueto, 1987 c g
 Uranotaenia briseis Dyar, 1925 c g
 Uranotaenia browni Mattingly, 1955 c g
 Uranotaenia brumpti Doucet, 1951 c g
 Uranotaenia brunhesi Grjebine, 1979 c g
 Uranotaenia cachani (Doucet, 1950) c g
 Uranotaenia caeruleocephala Theobald, 1901 c g
 Uranotaenia caliginosa Philip, 1931 c g
 Uranotaenia calosomata Dyar & Knab, 1907 c g
 Uranotaenia campestris Leicester, 1908 c g
 Uranotaenia capelai Cunha Ramos, 1993 c g
 Uranotaenia carcinicola da Cunha Ramos & Brunhes, 2004 c g
 Uranotaenia cavernicola Mattingly, 1954 c g
 Uranotaenia chorleyi Edwards, 1936 c g
 Uranotaenia christophersi Barraud, 1926 c g
 Uranotaenia civinskii Belkin, 1953 c g
 Uranotaenia clara Dyar & Shannon, 1925 c g
 Uranotaenia coatzacoalcos Dyar & Knab, 1906 c g
 Uranotaenia colocasiae Edwards, 1928 c g
 Uranotaenia combesi Doucet, 1950 c g
 Uranotaenia comorensis da Cunha Ramos & Brunhes, 2004 c g
 Uranotaenia confusa Peyton, 1977 c g
 Uranotaenia connali Edwards, 1912 c g
 Uranotaenia contrastata da Cunha Ramos & Brunhes, 2004 c g
 Uranotaenia cooki Root, 1937 c g
 Uranotaenia cornuta da Cunha Ramos & Brunhes, 2004 c g
 Uranotaenia damasei Grjebine, 1979 c g
 Uranotaenia davisi Lane, 1943 c g
 Uranotaenia demeilloni Peyton & Rattanarithikul, 1970 c g
 Uranotaenia devemyi Hamon, 1954 c g
 Uranotaenia diagonalis Brug, 1934 c g
 Uranotaenia dibrugarhensis Bhattacharyya, Prakash, Mohapatra & Mahanta, 2004 c g
 Uranotaenia diraphati Peyton & Klein, 1970 c g
 Uranotaenia ditaenionota Prado, 1931 c g
 Uranotaenia donai da Cunha Ramos & Brunhes, 2004 c g
 Uranotaenia douceti Grjebine, 1953 c g
 Uranotaenia dumonti Doucet, 1949 c g
 Uranotaenia dundo Cunha Ramos, 1993 c g
 Uranotaenia edwardsi Barraud, 1926 c g
 Uranotaenia elnora Paterson & Shannon, 1927 c g
 Uranotaenia enigmatica Peyton, 1977 c g
 Uranotaenia falcipes Banks, 1906 c g
 Uranotaenia fimbriata King & Hoogstraal, 1946 c g
 Uranotaenia fraseri Edwards, 1912 c g
 Uranotaenia fulgens da Cunha Ramos & Brunhes, 2004 c g
 Uranotaenia fusca Theobald, 1907 c g
 Uranotaenia gabaldoni Cova Garcia, Pulido F. & Escalante de Ugueto, 1987 c g
 Uranotaenia garnhami Someren, 1948 c g
 Uranotaenia geniculata da Cunha Ramos & Brunhes, 2004 c g
 Uranotaenia geometrica Theobald, 1901 c g
 Uranotaenia gerdae Slooff, 1963 c g
 Uranotaenia gigantea Brug, 1931 c g
 Uranotaenia gouldi Peyton & Klein, 1970 c g
 Uranotaenia grassei da Cunha Ramos & Brunhes, 2004 c g
 Uranotaenia grenieri Doucet, 1951 c g
 Uranotaenia grjebinei da Cunha Ramos & Brunhes, 2004 c g
 Uranotaenia haddowi da Cunha Ramos & Brunhes, 2004 c g
 Uranotaenia hamoni Grjebine, 1953 c g
 Uranotaenia harrisoni Peyton, 1977 c g
 Uranotaenia hebes Barraud, 1931 c g
 Uranotaenia hebrardi da Cunha Ramos & Brunhes, 2004 c g
 Uranotaenia heiseri Baisas, 1935 c g
 Uranotaenia henrardi Edwards, 1935 c g
 Uranotaenia henriquei Cunha Ramos, 1993 c g
 Uranotaenia hervyi da Cunha Ramos & Brunhes, 2004 c g
 Uranotaenia hirsutifemora Peters, 1964 c g
 Uranotaenia hongayi Galliard & Ngu, 1947 c g
 Uranotaenia hopkinsi Edwards, 1932 c g
 Uranotaenia husaini Qutubuddin, 1946 c g
 Uranotaenia hystera Dyar & Knab, 1913 c g
 Uranotaenia incognita Galindo & Blanton, 1954 c g
 Uranotaenia iriartei Cova Garcia, Pulido F. & Escalante de Ugueto, 1987 c g
 Uranotaenia jacksoni Edwards, 1935 c g
 Uranotaenia jinhongensis Dong, Dong & Zhou, 2003 c g
 Uranotaenia joucouri da Cunha Ramos & Brunhes, 2004 c g
 Uranotaenia koli Peyton & Klein, 1970 c g
 Uranotaenia kraussi Grjebine, 1953 c g
 Uranotaenia laffosseae da Cunha Ramos & Brunhes, 2004 c g
 Uranotaenia lanei Martinez & Prosen, 1953 c g
 Uranotaenia lateralis Ludlow, 1905 c g
 Uranotaenia lavieri Doucet, 1950 c g
 Uranotaenia lebiedi da Cunha Ramos & Brunhes, 2004 c g
 Uranotaenia legoffi da Cunha Ramos & Brunhes, 2004 c g
 Uranotaenia leiboensis Chu, 1981 c g
 Uranotaenia leucoptera (Theobald, 1907) c g
 Uranotaenia longirostris Leicester, 1908 c g
 Uranotaenia longitubus da Cunha Ramos & Brunhes, 2004 c g
 Uranotaenia lowii Theobald, 1901 i c g b
 Uranotaenia lucyae Someren, 1954 c g
 Uranotaenia ludlowae Dyar & Shannon, 1925 c g
 Uranotaenia lui Lien, 1968 c g
 Uranotaenia lunda Cunha Ramos, 1993 c g
 Uranotaenia luteola Edwards, 1934 c g
 Uranotaenia lutescens Leicester, 1908 c g
 Uranotaenia macfarlanei Edwards, 1914 c g
 Uranotaenia macferlanei Edwards, 1914 g
 Uranotaenia machadoi Cunha Ramos, 1986 c g
 Uranotaenia maculipleura Leicester, 1908 c g
 Uranotaenia madagascarensis da Cunha Ramos & Brunhes, 2004 c g
 Uranotaenia madagascarica da Cunha Ramos & Brunhes, 2004 c g
 Uranotaenia manakaraensis da Cunha Ramos & Brunhes, 2004 c g
 Uranotaenia mashonaensis Theobald, 1901 c g
 host of Nounané virus discovered by Junglen et al 2009
 Uranotaenia mathesoni Lane, 1943 c g
 Uranotaenia mattinglyi Qutubuddin, 1951 c g
 Uranotaenia maxima Leicester, 1908 c g
 Uranotaenia mayeri Edwards, 1912 c g
 Uranotaenia mayottensis Brunhes, 1977 c g
 Uranotaenia mendiolai Baisas, 1935 c g
 Uranotaenia mengi Chen, Wang & Zhao, 1989 c g
 Uranotaenia metatarsata Edwards, 1914 c g
 Uranotaenia micans Leicester, 1908 c g
 Uranotaenia micromelas Edwards, 1934 c g
 Uranotaenia modesta Leicester, 1908 c g
 Uranotaenia montana Ingram & Meillon, 1927 c g
 Uranotaenia moramangae da Cunha Ramos & Brunhes, 2004 c g
 Uranotaenia moresbyensis Peters, 1963 c g
 Uranotaenia moufiedi Peyton, 1977 c g
 Uranotaenia moultoni Edwards, 1914 c g
 Uranotaenia musarum Edwards, 1936 c g
 Uranotaenia nataliae Lynch Arribalzaga, 1891 c g
 Uranotaenia neireti Edwards, 1920 c g
 Uranotaenia neotibialis King & Hoogstraal, 1946 c g
 Uranotaenia nepenthes (Theobald, 1912) c g
 Uranotaenia nigricephala da Cunha Ramos & Brunhes, 2004 c g
 Uranotaenia nigripes (Theobald, 1905) c g
 Uranotaenia nigripleura da Cunha Ramos & Brunhes, 2004 c g
 Uranotaenia nigromaculata Edwards, 1941 c g
 Uranotaenia nivea Leicester, 1908 c g
 Uranotaenia nivipes (Theobald, 1905) c
 Uranotaenia nivipleura Leicester, 1908 c g
 Uranotaenia nivipous Theobald, 1912 c g
 Uranotaenia nocticola Peyton, 1977 c g
 Uranotaenia novaguinensis Peters, 1963 c g
 Uranotaenia novobscura Barraud, 1934 c g
 Uranotaenia obscura Edwards, 1915 c g
 Uranotaenia ohamai Tanaka, Mizusawa & Saugstad, 1975 c g
 Uranotaenia orientalis Barraud, 1926 c g
 Uranotaenia ornata Theobald, 1909 c g
 Uranotaenia orthodoxa Dyar, 1921 c g
 Uranotaenia oteizai Perez Vigueras, 1956 c g
 Uranotaenia ototomo Cunha Ramos, 1993 c g
 Uranotaenia painei Edwards, 1935 c g
 Uranotaenia pallidipleura da Cunha Ramos & Brunhes, 2004 c g
 Uranotaenia pallidocephala Theobald, 1908 c g
 Uranotaenia pallidoventer Theobald, 1903 c g
 Uranotaenia palmeirimi Meillon & Rebelo, 1941 c g
 Uranotaenia paludosa Galindo & Blanton, 1954 c g
 Uranotaenia pandani (Theobald, 1912) c g
 Uranotaenia paralateralis Peters, 1964 c g
 Uranotaenia paranovaguinensis Peters, 1963 c g
 Uranotaenia patriciae Peyton, 1977 c g
 Uranotaenia pauliani Doucet, 1949 c g
 Uranotaenia pefflyi Stone, 1961 c g
 Uranotaenia philonuxia Philip, 1931 c g
 Uranotaenia pifanoi Cova Garcia, Pulido F. & Escalante de Ugueto, 1981 c g
 Uranotaenia pilosa da Cunha Ramos & Brunhes, 2004 c g
 Uranotaenia prajimi Peyton & Rataanarithikul, 1970 c g
 Uranotaenia principensis Cunha Ramos, 1993 c g
 Uranotaenia propinqua (Mattingly, 1970) c g
 Uranotaenia pseudoalbimanus da Cunha Ramos & Brunhes, 2004 c g
 Uranotaenia pseudohenrardi Peters, 1955 c g
 Uranotaenia pseudomaculipleura Peyton & Rattanarithikul, 1970 c g
 Uranotaenia pseudoshillitonis da Cunha Ramos & Brunhes, 2004 c g
 Uranotaenia pulcherrima Lynch Arribalzaga, 1891 c g
 Uranotaenia pygmaea Theobald, 1901 c g
 Uranotaenia pylei Baisas, 1946 c g
 Uranotaenia quadrimaculata Edwards, 1929 c g
 Uranotaenia quasimodesta Peyton, 1977 c g
 Uranotaenia qui Dong,  Dong, Zhou, Wang & Lu, 2003 c g
 Uranotaenia quinquemaculata Bonne-Wepster, 1934 c g
 Uranotaenia rachoui Xavier & Silva Mattos, 1970 c g
 Uranotaenia ramosa Cunha Ramos, 1993 c g
 Uranotaenia rampae Peyton & Klein, 1970 c g
 Uranotaenia ravenalicola da Cunha Ramos & Brunhes, 2004 c g
 Uranotaenia recondita Edwards, 1922 c g
 Uranotaenia reinerti Peyton, 1977 c g
 Uranotaenia reyi Baisas, 1935 c g
 Uranotaenia rickenbachi Cunha Ramos, 1993 c g
 Uranotaenia riverai Duret, 1970 c g
 Uranotaenia roberti da Cunha Ramos & Brunhes, 2004 c g
 Uranotaenia rossi Delfinado, 1966 c g
 Uranotaenia rutherfordi Edwards, 1922 c g
 Uranotaenia ryukyuana Tanaka, Mizusawa & Saugstad, 1979 c g
 Uranotaenia sapphirina (Osten Sacken, 1868) i c g b
 Uranotaenia scutostriata da Cunha Ramos & Brunhes, 2004 c g
 Uranotaenia setosa King & Hoogstraal, 1946 c g
 Uranotaenia sexaueri Belkin, 1953 c g
 Uranotaenia shillitonis Edwards, 1932 c g
 Uranotaenia signata Cunha Ramos, 1993 c g
 Uranotaenia socialis Theobald, 1901 c g
 Uranotaenia solomonis Belkin, 1953 c g
 Uranotaenia sombooni Peyton & Klein, 1970 c g
 Uranotaenia spiculosa Peyton & Rattanarithikul, 1970 c g
 Uranotaenia spinitubus da Cunha Ramos & Brunhes, 2004 c g
 Uranotaenia spinosa da Cunha Ramos & Brunhes, 2004 c g
 Uranotaenia spiraculata da Cunha Ramos & Brunhes, 2004 c g
 Uranotaenia srilankensis Peyton, 1974 c g
 Uranotaenia stricklandi Barraud, 1926 c g
 Uranotaenia subnormalis Martini, 1920 c g
 Uranotaenia subtibioclada King & Hoogstraal, 1946 c g
 Uranotaenia sumethi Peyton & Rattanarithikul, 1970 c g
 Uranotaenia syntheta Dyar & Shannon, 1924 c g
 Uranotaenia tanzaniae Cunha Ramos, 1993 c g
 Uranotaenia telmatophila Galindo & Blanton, 1954 c g
 Uranotaenia testacea Theobald, 1905 c g
 Uranotaenia tibialis Taylor, 1919 c g
 Uranotaenia tibioclada King & Hoogstraal, 1946 c g
 Uranotaenia trapidoi Galindo & Blanton, 1954 c g
 Uranotaenia tricolor da Cunha Ramos & Brunhes, 2004 c g
 Uranotaenia tridentata da Cunha Ramos & Brunhes, 2004 c g
 Uranotaenia trilineata Leicester, 1908 c g
 Uranotaenia tsaratananae Doucet, 1950 c g
 Uranotaenia typhlosomata Dyar & Knab, 1907 c g
 Uranotaenia ugandae Cunha Ramos, 1993 c g
 Uranotaenia unguiculata Edwards, 1913 c g
 Uranotaenia unimaculiala Leicester, 1908 c g
 Uranotaenia wysockii Belkin, 1953 c g
 Uranotaenia xanthomelaena Edwards, 1925 c g
 Uranotaenia yaeyamana Tanaka, Mizusawa & Saugstad, 1975 c g
 Uranotaenia yovani Someren, 1951 c g
 Uranotaenia yunnanensis Dong, Dong & Wu, 2004 c g

Data sources: i = ITIS, c = Catalogue of Life, g = GBIF, b = Bugguide.net

References

Uranotaenia